Huỳnh Thúc Kháng (1 October 1876 – 21 April 1947), also known as Cụ Huỳnh (lit: 'Great-grandfather' Huỳnh), was a Vietnamese anti-colonial activist, statesman and journalist, most notably serving as Acting President of Vietnam and President of the Annamese House of Representatives.

He was born in Tiên Phước District in Quảng Nam Province, the same district from which Phan Chu Trinh hailed. Kháng went on to top the imperial examinations in 1900. Along with Phan Chu Trinh and Trần Quý Cáp, Kháng led the Duy Tân movement, for which he was imprisoned in Côn Đảo island by the French from 1908 to 1919. He was elected to the House of Representatives of the Protectorate of Annam and served as its President from 1926 to 1928. In 1927, he founded the Huế-based Tiếng Dân newspaper, which gained prominence among the Vietnamese intelligentsia at the time but was shut down by the colonial authority in 1943.

Following the August Revolution, he participated in the Việt Minh-led coalition government as an independent and was appointed Minister of Home Affairs on 2 March 1946. From 31 May to 21 October 1946, he was the Acting President of the Democratic Republic of Vietnam (and ex officio Acting Prime Minister) while Hồ Chí Minh was negotiating in France. In 1946, Kháng came back to Quảng Ngãi to lead the fight against the French in the 5th Interzone. He died on 21 April 1947 under suspicious circumstances and was buried atop the Thiên Ấn mountain, a prominent landmark of Quảng Ngãi. 

Most cities in Vietnam have named major streets after him. In 2013, he was posthumously awarded the Gold Star Order, the highest honor of Vietnam.

References

1876 births
1947 deaths
Vietnamese nationalists
Vietnamese Confucianists
People from Quảng Nam province
Presidents of Vietnam
Prime Ministers of Vietnam